Panama is a city in Shelby County, Iowa, United States. The population was 235 at the time of the 2020 census.

History 
Panama had its start in the year 1882 by the building of the Chicago, Milwaukee and St. Paul Railway through that territory.

Geography
Panama is located at  (41.726691, -95.474235).

The community is on Iowa Highway 191, halfway between U.S. Routes 30 and 59

Demographics

2010 census
As of the census of 2010, there were 221 people, 98 households, and 57 families living in the city. The racial makeup of the city was 96.4% White, 1.8% from other races, and 1.8% from two or more races. Hispanic or Latino of any race were 1.8% of the population.

There were 98 households, of which 24.5% had children under the age of 18 living with them, 52.0% were married couples living together, 3.1% had a female householder with no husband present, 3.1% had a male householder with no wife present, and 41.8% were non-families. 37.8% of all households were made up of individuals, and 21.5% had someone living alone who was 65 years of age or older. The average household size was 2.26 and the average family size was 2.96.

The median age in the city was 40.5 years. 25.8% of residents were under the age of 18; 5.5% were between the ages of 18 and 24; 23.9% were from 25 to 44; 26.7% were from 45 to 64; and 18.1% were 65 years of age or older. The gender makeup of the city was 46.2% male and 53.8% female.

2000 census
As of the census of 2000, there were 212 people, 96 households, and 57 families living in the city. The racial makeup of the city was 98.11% White, 0.47% African American, and 1.42% from two or more races.

There were 96 households, out of which 21.9% had children under the age of 18 living with them, 54.2% were married couples living together, 3.1% had a female householder with no husband present, and 39.6% were non-families. 36.5% of all households were made up of individuals, and 18.8% had someone living alone who was 65 years of age or older. The average household size was 2.21 and the average family size was 2.95.

In the city, the population was spread out, with 23.6% under the age of 18, 6.1% from 18 to 24, 28.8% from 25 to 44, 17.9% from 45 to 64, and 23.6% who were 65 years of age or older. The median age was 40 years. For every 100 females, there were 86.0 males. For every 100 females age 18 and over, there were 92.9 males.

The median income for a household in the city was $37,917, and the median income for a family was $55,000. Males had a median income of $29,375 versus $25,556 for females. The per capita income for the city was $20,078. About 3.4% of families and 5.6% of the population were below the poverty line, including none of those under the age of eighteen and 14.0% of those 65 or over.

Education
The Harlan Community School District operates local public schools.  The district serves the towns of Harlan, Defiance, Earling, Panama, Portsmouth and Westphalia, the unincorporated communities of Jacksonville and Corley, and the surrounding rural areas.

References

External links
 City website

Cities in Shelby County, Iowa
Cities in Iowa